Buffalo Soapstone is a census-designated place (CDP) in Matanuska-Susitna Borough, Alaska,  United States. It is part of the Anchorage, Alaska Metropolitan Statistical Area. The population was 1,021 at the 2020 census, up from 855 in 2010.

Geography

Demographics

Buffalo Soapstone first appeared on the 2000 U.S. Census as a census-designated place (CDP).

As of the census of 2000, there were 699 people, 233 households, and 171 families residing in the CDP. There were 266 housing units at an average density of 11.8/sq mi (4.5/km2). The racial makeup of the CDP was 89.70% White, 0.29% Black or African American, 4.43% Native American, 0.43% Asian, 1.14% from other races, and 4.01% from two or more races.  1.57% of the population were Hispanic or Latino of any race.

There were 233 households, out of which 45.9% had children under the age of 18 living with them, 57.9% were married couples living together, 6.4% had a female householder with no husband present, and 26.2% were non-families. 19.3% of all households were made up of individuals, and 1.7% had someone living alone who was 65 years of age or older. The average household size was 2.00 and the average family size was 3.20.

In the CDP, the population was spread out, with 33.8% under the age of 18, 7.9% from 18 to 24, 33.8% from 25 to 44, 21.7% from 45 to 64, and 2.9% who were 65 years of age or older.  The median age was 33 years. For every 100 females, there were 117.8 males.  For every 100 females age 18 and over, there were 122.6 males.

The median income for a household in the CDP was $41,264, and the median income for a family was $40,678.09. Males had a median income of $45,208 versus $26,167 for females. The per capita income for the CDP was $18,021.  About 22.8% of families and 22.2% of the population were below the poverty line, including 31.4% of those under age 18 and 14.3% of those age 65 or over.

References

External links

Census-designated places in Alaska
Census-designated places in Matanuska-Susitna Borough, Alaska
Anchorage metropolitan area